Sonya Hardcastle (born 16 April 1972) is a New Zealand former international netball player.

An attacking midcourt player, Hardcastle was first selected for the New Zealand national netball team, the Silver Ferns, in 1992. She sustained a back injury the following year, which kept her out of the 1993 World Games. Outside of netball, Hardcastle was stalked several times during her early international career. After taking time out to focus on studies, Hardcastle rejoined the Silver Ferns in 1997, and went on to win silver medals at the 1998 Commonwealth Games and 1999 Netball World Championships.

With the start of the Coca-Cola Cup (later the National Bank Cup) in 1998, Hardcastle signed with the Northern Force; having moved to live in Invercargill, she also started playing provincial netball for Southland. She announced her retirement from all forms of netball after 1999, although she played again with the Northern Force in 2001; she also made a surprise return to play with North Harbour in the 2008 provincial netball season.

Her sisters Nadine and Rochelle also played alongside Sonya in domestic netball, with Rochelle joining her in the Northern Force. Her mother is also a coach with Netball North Harbour.

References

External links 
 Profile at the New Zealand Olympic Committee website

New Zealand netball players
New Zealand international netball players
Netball players at the 1998 Commonwealth Games
Commonwealth Games silver medallists for New Zealand
New Zealand Māori netball players
1972 births
Living people
Commonwealth Games medallists in netball
Netball players at the 1993 World Games
1999 World Netball Championships players
Northern Force players
Northern Mystics coaches
Medallists at the 1998 Commonwealth Games